Arthropterus is a genus of beetles in the family Carabidae, containing the following species:

 Arthropterus abnormis Oke, 1932 
 Arthropterus adelaidae Macleay, 1873 
 Arthropterus ambitiosus Kolbe, 1924 
 Arthropterus angulatus Macleay, 1873 
 Arthropterus angulicornis Macleay, 1873 
 Arthropterus articularis Elston, 1919 
 Arthropterus bisinuatus Macleay, 1873 
 Arthropterus brevicollis Macleay, 1873 
 Arthropterus brevis Westwood, 1851 
 Arthropterus brunni Kolbe, 1924 
 Arthropterus cerapteroides Mjampberg, 1916 
 Arthropterus constricticeps Sloane, 1933 
 Arthropterus cribrosus Sloane, 1933 
 Arthropterus daemelianus Kolbe, 1924 
 Arthropterus darlingensis Macleay, 1873 
 Arthropterus denudatus (Westwood, 1850) 
 Arthropterus depressus Macleay, 1873 
 Arthropterus discrepans Kolbe, 1924 
 Arthropterus distinctus (Thomson, 1860) 
 Arthropterus donovani Kolbe, 1924 
 Arthropterus elongatulus Macleay, 1871 
 Arthropterus eruditulus Kolbe, 1924 
 Arthropterus foveicollis Macleay, 1873 
 Arthropterus foveipennis Blackburn, 1892 
 Arthropterus fraternus Kolbe, 1924 
 Arthropterus geminus Kolbe, 1924 
 Arthropterus hirtus Macleay, 1873 
 Arthropterus hopei (Westwood, 1843) 
 Arthropterus horni Kolbe, 1924 
 Arthropterus howittensis Masters, 1886 
 Arthropterus howittii Macleay, 1873 
 Arthropterus humeralis Macleay, 1873 
 Arthropterus insidiosus Kolbe, 1924 
 Arthropterus kingii Macleay, 1871 
 Arthropterus latipennis Macleay, 1873 
 Arthropterus limitans Kolbe, 1924 
 Arthropterus longicollis Sloane, 1933 
 Arthropterus macleayi (Donovan, 1805) 
 Arthropterus mastersii Macleay, 1871 
 Arthropterus melbournei (Westwood, 1874) 
 Arthropterus montanus Macleay, 1873 
 Arthropterus moretoni Kolbe, 1924 
 Arthropterus neglectus Lea, 1910 
 Arthropterus negligens Kolbe, 1924 
 Arthropterus nigricornis Macleay, 1973 
 Arthropterus occidentalis Blackburn, 1892 
 Arthropterus odewahnii Macleay, 1873 
 Arthropterus ominosus Kolbe, 1924 
 Arthropterus ovicollis Macleay, 1873 
 Arthropterus pellax Kolbe, 1924 
 Arthropterus pervicax Kolbe, 1924 
 Arthropterus petax Kolbe, 1924 
 Arthropterus piceus (Westwood, 1838) 
 Arthropterus picipes Macleay, 1873 
 Arthropterus planicornis Sloane, 1933 
 Arthropterus punctatissimus (Westwood, 1874) 
 Arthropterus puncticollus Macleay, 1873 
 Arthropterus quadricollis (Westwood, 1874) 
 Arthropterus queenslandiae Wasmann, 1926 
 Arthropterus riverinae Macleay, 1873A 
 Arthropterus rockhamptonensis Macleay, 1873 
 Arthropterus schismaticus Kolbe, 1924 
 Arthropterus schroederi Kolbe, 1924 
 Arthropterus scutellaris Macleay, 1873 
 Arthropterus secedens Kolbe, 1924 
 Arthropterus simiolus Kolbe, 1924 
 Arthropterus socius Kolbe, 1924 
 Arthropterus spadiceus Kolbe, 1924 
 Arthropterus sphinx Kolbe, 1924 
 Arthropterus subampliatus Macleay, 1873 
 Arthropterus subangulatus Kolbe, 1924 
 Arthropterus subsulcatus (Westwood, 1850) 
 Arthropterus suspectus Kolbe, 1924 
 Arthropterus turneri Macleay, 1873 
 Arthropterus waterhousei Macleay, 1873 
 Arthropterus westwoodii Macleay, 1871 
 Arthropterus wilsoni (Westwood, 1850) 
 Arthropterus wyanamattae Macleay, 1873

References

Paussinae